Belgium debuted in the Eurovision Song Contest 1956, held on 24 May 1956 at the Teatro Cursaal in Lugano, Switzerland. The Walloon broadcaster INR organised a national final to determine two Belgian entries for the contest. Held on 15 April 1956 in Brussels, the event saw ten songs compete to be the Belgian entries; the results were determined by the jury panel and postcard voting. The songs "Messieurs les noyés de la Seine" by Fud Leclerc and "Le plus beau jour de ma vie" by Mony Marc were selected to represent the nation. Belgian entries performed 3rd and 10th, respectively, out of the 14 entries competing in the contest.

Background 
The European Broadcasting Union (EBU) was formed in 1950 among 23 organisations with the aim of the exchange of television programmes. Following the formation of the EBU, a number of notable events were transmitted through its networks in various European countries, such as Belgium, France, and the United Kingdom. Following this series of transmissions, a "Programme Committee" was set up within the EBU to investigate new initiatives for cooperation between broadcasters. The new European contest, entitled European Grand Prix, was subsequently approved at the EBU's General Assembly in October 1955. A planning sub-group, was subsequently formed to build out the rules of the competition. The rules of the contest were finalised and distributed to EBU members in early 1956. Per the rules of the contest, each participating country submitted two songs into the contest. Belgium was subsequently included on the EBU's list of 7 countries that had signed up to partake in the contest. Belgian broadcasters NIR and INR were both set to be responsible for the selection of a nation's representatives, however NIR later withdrew from the contest, citing busyness related to the participation in the Venice International Festival, leaving INR as the only participating Belgian broadcaster in that year's contest. For the 1956 contest, INR held a national final to choose two nation's representatives.

Before Eurovision

Finale Nationale du Grand Prix Eurovision 1956 de la Chanson Europeenne 
To select its entry for the Eurovision Song Contest 1956, INR hosted a national final, entitled Finale Nationale du Grand Prix Eurovision 1956 de la Chanson Europeenne, on 15 April 1956 in Brussels. National final was hosted by Jacques Goosens and broadcast on INR at 20:40 CET. Prior to the event, 436 songs had been submitted to the broadcaster; ten candidate entries from six acts were then selected by a jury panel, consisting of Angele Guller, Steve Hirk, Peter Packay and Rene Henoumont, from the received submissions. Competing entries were performed two times, first time in instrumental and in second time they were sang. Competing entries first faced a jury vote where "Messieurs les noyés de la Seine" by Fud Leclerc was selected as the first winner. Then, "Le plus beau jour de ma vie" by Mony Marc was selected as the second winner from the remaining nine entries by the public postcard voting.

At Eurovision 
"" was performed 3rd at the contest and "" was performed 10th. Both of the Belgian entries were conducted at the contest by the composer Léo Souris. The full results of the contest were not revealed and have not been retained by the EBU. Eurovision Song Contest 1956 was televised in Belgium on INR and NIR. Following the Eurovision Song Contest, "Messieurs les noyés de la Seine" was accused of plagiarism from the song "Le noye Assassé" by Philippe Clay, by the Belgian songwriters and the author's organisation SABAM.

References

Bibliography
 
 
 

1956
Countries in the Eurovision Song Contest 1956